Maxwell Woledzi (born 2 July 2001) is a Ghanaian professional footballer who plays as a centre-back for Portuguese club Vitória de Guimarães B.

Career statistics

Club

Notes

References

2001 births
Living people
Ghanaian footballers
Association football defenders
Right to Dream Academy players
FC Nordsjælland players
Vitória S.C. B players
Danish Superliga players
Ghanaian expatriate footballers
Expatriate men's footballers in Denmark
Ghanaian expatriate sportspeople in Denmark
Expatriate footballers in Portugal
Ghanaian expatriate sportspeople in Portugal